The Four Seasons, originally referring to the traditional seasons of spring, summer, autumn and winter (typical of a temperate climate), may refer to:

Music 
 The Four Seasons (Vivaldi), a 1725 set of four violin concertos by Antonio Vivaldi
 The Four Seasons (band), an American pop/rock band
 Four Seasons (EP), a 2006 EP by Kaddisfly
 Four Seasons (Toshiko Akiyoshi Trio album), 1990
 Four Seasons (Bobby Hutcherson album), recorded 1983 released 1985
 Four Seasons, a 2012 compilation album by Paul Oakenfold
 "Four Seasons" (song), a 2019 song by Taeyeon

Visual arts 
 Four Seasons (Chagall), a 1974 mosaic designed by Marc Chagall
 Four Seasons (sculpture set), an artwork on the campus of the Indianapolis Museum of Art
 The Four Seasons (Poussin), a set of four paintings by Nicolas Poussin
 The Four Seasons (Sozzi), a cycle of four frescoes by Francesco Sozzi
 The Four Seasons (Arcimboldo), a set of four paintings by Giuseppe Arcimboldo
 The Seasons (Mucha), also known as Four Seasons, a series of color lithographs by Alphonse Mucha

Film and television 
Seasons of the Year (Four Seasons), a 1975 Armenian documentary film
 The Four Seasons (1979 film), a Yugoslav film directed by Petar Krelja
 The Four Seasons (1981 film), an American film directed by Alan Alda
 The Four Seasons (2000 film), an animated feature film of 2000
 Four Seasons, a 2008 UK drama TV series directed by Giles Foster
 The Four Seasons, a 1984 American TV sitcom featuring Joanna Kerns

In business 
 The Four Seasons Restaurant, in New York City
 Four Seasons Hotels and Resorts, a luxury hotel chain
 Four Seasons Health Care, a UK-based elderly and specialist care provider
 Four Seasons Wines, an Indian winery
 Four Seasons Total Landscaping, a Philadelphia business famous for hosting a press conference
 Four Seasons Town Centre, a mall in Greensboro, North Carolina, U.S.
 Four Seasons, a brand of the Spring Air Company

Venues 
 Four Seasons Arena, a multi-use venue in Great Falls, Montana, U.S.
 Four Seasons Centre, a 2006 Toronto opera and ballet venue

Other uses 
 The Four Seasons (ballet), a ballet by Jerome Robbins
 Four Seasons (card game), a patience or solitaire

See also
 
 TQS (Télévision Quatre Saisons), a French-language television network in Canada
 The Seasons (disambiguation)
 Season (disambiguation)